Goblin is a 2010 television film directed by Jeffery Scott Lando and written by Raul Inglis. The movie was released on the Syfy channel on July 7, 2010. Filming for Goblin took place in Pitt Meadows, British Columbia, Canada.

Plot

In 1831 a hamlet holds a yearly ritual to cleanse their home of anything they view as unclean. As a result, the deformed infant of a witch is thrown into a bonfire, which enrages her. She curses the town, saying that every Halloween a goblin will come to the town and try to take its children. Anyone attempting to stand in its way will be killed brutally.

Years later in modern day, Neil Perkins (Gil Bellows) travels to the hamlet (now called Hollowglen) with the intent of developing the town. With him are his wife Kate (Camille Sullivan), their two children, teenager Nikki (Tracy Spiridakos) and the infant Nathan, as well as Nikki's best friend. They're warned of the town's curse and that as they are arriving on Halloween eve, Nathan's life is in danger. The Perkins ignore the threat, only to find themselves in mortal danger.

Cast
 Gil Bellows as Neil Perkins
 Tracy Spiridakos as Nikki Perkins
 Camille Sullivan as Kate Perkins
 Donnelly Rhodes as Charlie
 Reilly Dolman as Kyle
 Andrew Wheeler as Sheriff Milgreen
 Colin Cunningham as Owen
 Erin Boyes as Cammy
 Jordan Moore as Nathan Perkins
 Brett Dier as Matt
 Ryan Grantham as Ben

Reception
Critical reception for Goblin was mostly negative. Dread Central gave the film 1 1/2 blades, calling it an "entirely unfulfilling piece of strictly by-the-numbers Syfy filler". PopMatters gave a similarly themed review, stating that it should be "avoided at all costs". HorrorNews.net gave a slightly more positive review, criticizing it while also stating that it would best appeal to people who have "a certain affinity for these kinds of movies". A staff member for HorrorTalk gave an overall positive review for Goblin, calling it a "guilty pleasure".

References

External links
 

2010 television films
2010 films
Canadian horror television films
2010s supernatural horror films
Goblin films
Films shot in British Columbia
English-language Canadian films
CineTel Films films
2010s monster movies
Canadian supernatural horror films
Canadian monster movies
Syfy original films
Films directed by Jeffery Scott Lando
2010s American films
2010s Canadian films